In computer science, more particularly in formal language theory, a cyclic language is a set of strings that is closed with respect to repetition, root, and cyclic shift.

Definition
If A is a set of symbols, and A* is the set of all strings built from symbols in A, then a string set L ⊆ A* is called a formal language over the alphabet A.
The language L is called cyclic if
 ∀w∈A*. ∀n>0. w ∈ L ⇔ wn ∈ L, and
 ∀v,w∈A*. vw ∈ L ⇔ wv ∈ L,
where wn denotes the n-fold repetition of the string w, and vw denotes the concatenation of the strings v and w.

Examples
For example, using the alphabet A = {a, b }, the language

is cyclic, but not regular.
However, L is context-free, since M = { an1bn1 an2bn2 ... ank bnk : ni ≥ 0 } is, and context-free languages are closed under circular shift; L is obtained as circular shift of M.

References

Formal languages